Erol Uenala, also known as Erol Unala, is a Swiss industrial and metal musician. He was a member of the industrial metal band Apollyon Sun and the thrash metal band Celtic Frost.

Career
Uenala and his brother Kurt grew up in Aadorf, Switzerland. 

Apollyon Sun were an industrial metal band co-formed by Uenala in early 1995. He played guitars on the following three Apollyon Sun recordings: 1998's God Leaves (And Dies) (EP); 2000's Sub and the Sub Sampler EP. For Celtic Frost, he played guitars and did electronic drum programming for the 2002 Prototype demo and for 2006's Monotheist single.

References

Swiss rock musicians
Swiss guitarists
Living people
Year of birth missing (living people)